Doris Wong Wai Yin (born in 1981), is a Hong Kong born artist, working with various types of media such as paintings, sculpture, collages, installations, videos and photography. Through her works, she explores her internal conflicts, raising and answering questions about her journey of motherhood, fears, and struggle with self-doubt.

Background
Born in Hong Kong in 1981, Wong graduated with a Bachelor of Fine Arts degree from the Chinese University of Hong Kong in 2004, and a Master in Fine Arts from the University of Leeds in 2005. She worked as a project assistant in Asia Art Archive in 2009 on documentation and website project named "Materials of the Future: Documenting Contemporary Chinese Art from 1980-1990". She returned to Asia Art Archive as an artist-in-residence from late 2010 to mid 2011. She was also the Founder of the Observation Society in Guangzhou. She now teaches as a part-time lecturer at the City University of Hong Kong and the Hong Kong University of Science and Technology. She joined the Department of Fine Arts, Chinese University of Hong Kong in 2012.

Work 
Wong's works include painting, sculpture, collage, installations and photography. She frequently investigates the nature of what is real or fake, what constitutes art and what does not. Creating emulators, Wong juxtaposes "raw" pieces alongside the original articles, dispelling the notion of an ideal framework, and encouraging viewers to question the nature of authenticity; challenging preconceptions whilst blurring boundaries. Wong has exhibited her works extensively in Hong Kong, as well as showcases in Japan, U.S.A, Singapore and Guangzhou.

Wong is also interested in questions on institutions' inclusion or exclusion of artists and their works in exhibitions and historical documentation. Through her works, she meditated upon the construction of art history and questioned the institutions and systems involved in the process. Her inquiry into the role institution plays in an artist's success is related to her concern over what constitutes an honest artwork, free from the artist's ego and perhaps, free from what was taught by institutions in an artist's life.

Selected work 
Wong's video work titled "Tribute to the Inside Looking Out: For the male artists along my way" created in 2008 is on view in M+. The work is a response to her personal experience of being introduced only as a girlfriend, not an artist, when visiting the exhibition called "Inside Looking Out" at Osage Gallery in Beijing with six male friends, all of whom were her friends from art school. The work depicts a sequence of the six artists appearing on screen one by one, separately. After some time, a stool is launched from off-screen that strikes the head of the artist in the frame. In the video's rolling credits, a male version of the famous Cantonese pop song called "Fragile Woman" by Faye Wong plays in the background. Wong described this work as the only time she had considered feminism in artworks.

Personal life 
Wong currently lives and works in Hong Kong. She is married to artist Kwan Sheung-chi, with whom she has worked on several projects such as "EVERYTHING GOES WRONG FOR THE POOR COUPLE", addressing questions such as "What are Hong Kong's core values?" and "What is art?". The couple has one son together.

Exhibitions

Selected solo exhibitions 
 2016. "Without Trying", Spring Workshop, Hong Kong
 2011. "Becoming a Different Person Might be Hard" – A Painting Exhibition of Wong Wai Yin, iPRECIATION, Hong Kong
 2011. "From Wong Wai Yin's Collection to the Hong Kong Art Archive", Asia Art Archive, Hong Kong
 2010. "Woofer Café Ten", Woofer Ten, Hong Kong
 2009. "L'Écume des choses" – l'art de Wong Wai Yin, Observation Society, Guangzhou, China

Selected group exhibitions 
 2014. "Man's Future Fund", Discover Asia, Art Fair Tokyo, Japan
 2013. ""But is it Art?" "I know but I don't know."", Gallery EXIT, Hong Kong
 2013. "The Imperfect Circle", Osage Gallery, Kwun Tong, Hong Kong
 2013. "BiennaleOnline 2013"
 2013. "Hong Kong Eye", ArtisTree, Hong Kong
 2012. "Mobile M+: Yau Ma Tei", Yau Ma Tei, Hong Kong
 2012. "Why Do Trees Grow Till the End?", SOUTHSITE, Hong Kong
 2012. "Wearable Exhibition: Bring Art Everywhere", Fotan, Hong Kong
 2011. "Primitive Craftsmanship – Contemporary Mechanism", Artist Commune, Hong Kong
 2011. "Except why not just come right out and say it:", Collectors House, Heerlen, The Netherlands
 2010. "Siu Sai Gual Bananale", Woofer Ten, Hong Kong
 2010. "Taipei Biennial 2010", Taipei Fine Arts Museum, Taipei, Taiwan
 2010. "Everything Goes Wrong for the Poor Couple", ART HK 10, Hong Kong
 2010. "Go: The First OCAT Youth Exhibition", OCT Contemporary Art Terminal, Shenzhen, China
 2010. "A Guide to Job Loss", Inheritance Projects, Shenzhen, China
 2010. "FAX", Para/Site Art Space, Hong Kong
 2009. "ISCP Open Studio", ISCP, New York, USA
 2009. "One Degree of Separation", Chinese Arts Centre, Manchester, UK
 2009. "Louis Vuitton: A Passion for Creation", Hong Kong Museum of Art, Hong Kong
 2009. "Muse", Louis Vuitton Gallery, Hong Kong
 2009. "Some Rooms", Osage Gallery, Kwun Tong, Hong Kong
 2009. "Charming Experience", Hong Kong Museum of Art, Hong Kong
 2009. "Reality Revisited", OC Gallery, Hong Kong
 2008. "Wanakio 2008", Okinawa, Japan
 2008. "Reversed Reality", Worksound, Portland, USA
 2008. "The 3rd Guangzhou Triennial", Guangdong Museum of Art, Guangzhou, China
 2008. "Inside Looking Out", Osage Gallery, Singapore
 2008. "Women's Work", Osage Gallery, Kwun Tong, Hong Kong
 2008. "Sick Leaves" Conceptual Art Exhibition, C&G Artpartment, Hong Kong
 2008. "Shek Kip Mei / World: Public Housing 20/20", MOST, Jockey Club Creative Arts Centre, Hong Kong
 2008. "Hong Kong Anarchitecture Bananas: Artists who reclaim space", Artist Commune, Hong Kong
 2008. "Fair Enough", Blue Lotus Gallery, Hong Kong
 2008. "Sun of Beach", Wong Wai Wheel Artspace, Hong Kong
 2008. "Fotanian: Fotan Artists Open Studios 2008", =(o-otter studio, Fotanian Artists Studios, Hong Kong
 2007. "Vending Art Machine" Made in Hong Kong, Hong Kong Museum of Art, Hong Kong
 2007. "Copied Right", Para/Site Art Space, Hong Kong
 2007. "Time After Time", Basement, Hollywood Centre, Hong Kong
 2007. "97+10" Reversing Horizons, Artist Reflections of the Hong Kong Handover 10th Anniversary, MoCA Shanghai, Shanghai, China
 2007. "Exhibitions On – Fire!", Para/Site Central, Hong Kong
 2007. "Variances in Singular", Too Art, Hong Kong Arts Centre, Hong Kong
 2007. "Fotanian: Open Studio 2007", =(o-otter studio, Fotanian Artists Studios, Hong Kong
 2006. "Dream a little dream", Basement, Hollywood Centre, Hong Kong
 2006. "aWay" Group Exhibition of Contemporary Visual Artists, 1a space, Hong Kong
 2005. "Hong Kong Art Biennial Exhibition 2005", Hong Kong Museum of Art, Hong Kong
 2005. "Art SuperMart＠Para/Site", Para/Site Art Space, Hong Kong
 2005. "Studio Visit", Bankley House Studios, Manchester, UK
 2005. "Meeting Point" MA Fine Art Graduation Show, University of Leeds, Leeds, UK
 2004. "Build: HK Spirit Red White Blue", Hong Kong Heritage Museum, Hong Kong
 2004. "CUHK Fine Art Graduation Show", The Chinese University of Hong Kong, Hong Kong
 2004. "Sculpture non Sculpture", 1a space, Hong Kong
 2003. "Fotanian", Yiliu Painting Factory, Fotanian Artists Studios, Hong Kong
 2003. "Hong Kong Art Biennial Exhibition 2003", Hong Kong Museum of Art, Hong Kong
 2003. "Just Do It" Sharon Lam, Doris To and Wong Wai-yin Joint Exhibition, The Chinese University of Hong Kong, Hong Kong
 2002. "Cho Siu-yee and Wong Wai-yin Joint Exhibition", The Chinese University of Hong Kong, Hong Kong

Curated projects
 2011. "Love and Community", Woofer Ten, Hong Kong
 2010. "Kanyu Weiti Fengshui Weiyong Sculpture Installation", Woofer Ten, Hong Kong
 2008. "Sun of Beach", Wong Wai Wheel Artspace, Hong Kong

Awards
 2009. "ADC and ACC Artist-in-Residence Fellowship", Hong Kong Arts Development Council and Asian Cultural Council, Hong Kong
 2004. "The British Chevening Scholarship", Hong Kong Arts Development Council, Hong Kong
 2003. "Hui's Fine Arts Award", The Art of CUHK 2003, The Chinese University of Hong Kong, Hong Kong
 2003. "Cheung's Fine Arts Award", The Art of CUHK 2003, The Chinese University of Hong Kong, Hong Kong

Artist-in-residence
 2011. "From Wong Wai Yin's Collection to the Hong Kong Art Archive", Asia Art Archive, Hong Kong
 2009–2010. ISCP, New York, USA
 2008. "Wanakio 2008", Okinawa, Japan
 2008. Worksound, Portland, USA

Collections

Private collections 
Hong Kong Museum of Art
 Hong Kong Kadist Art Foundation, Paris/San Francisco
 M+, Hong Kong

Publications
• The Ten Seconds Preceding the Decision that A Can Be Made Into A Work (2016)

• Without Trying (2016)

• A place never been seen is not a place (2017)

• Everyone's Fine (2021)

References

1981 births
Living people
Alumni of the Chinese University of Hong Kong
Alumni of the University of Leeds
Hong Kong artists
Hong Kong women artists